RFD-TV Canada is a Canadian English language licence-exempted Category B specialty channel broadcasting programming focused on the agribusiness, equine and the rural lifestyles, along with traditional country music and entertainment. The channel is owned by Ryan Kohler through Wild TV Inc.

History
The channel launched on February 1, 2020 on Shaw Direct television systems in high definition through a partnership with Rural Media Group, licensing the brand and majority of its content from its U.S. counterpart, RFD-TV.

References

External links
 RFD-TV Canada website

Television channels and stations established in 2020
Digital cable television networks in Canada
English-language television stations in Canada
2020 establishments in Canada
Agricultural television stations